Albaladejo del Cuende is a municipality in Cuenca, Castile-La Mancha, Spain. It has a population of 245 as of 2020.

References 

Municipalities in the Province of Cuenca